Elizabeth Rose was a Benedictine nun at Chelles, France. She founded the convent of Sainte-Marie-du-Rozoy, near Courtenay, Loiret, France, and served as its first abbess. Eventually she retired to live as an anchoress in a hollow oak tree.

Notes

French Roman Catholic saints
12th-century Christian saints
1130 deaths
Benedictine nuns
Year of birth unknown
Female saints of medieval France
Medieval French saints
12th-century French nuns